YAM (short for Yet Another Mailer) is a MIME-compliant E-mail client written for AmigaOS and derivative operating systems. Originally created by Marcel Beck, it currently supports multiple user accounts, encrypted communications via OpenSSL and PGP, unlimited hierarchical folders and filters, a configurable GUI based on MUI, extensive ARexx support for automating tasks, and most of the features to be expected in modern E-mail clients.

History 

The initial release from 1995 arrived when the Internet was still something very new for the average Amiga user. However, as time passed and further 1.x updates were released, YAM became quickly popular thanks to its simplicity and comprehensible user interface at a time when competing products were either German only (MicroDot), required a shareware fee (MicroDot-II) or used a less intuitive GUI in comparison, such as Thor.

The early YAM 1.x series, while very usable for the most part, was relatively basic and spartan in terms of functionality. It wasn't until 2.0 that finally the program started showing its full potential, featuring a major redesign of the user interface and a plethora of new features which turned it into the de facto standard Amiga E-mail client ever since.

Released in late 2000, YAM 2.2 was the last update from Marcel Beck, who ceased Amiga development but also released the sources under the GNU GPL-2.0-or-later. A group of Amiga developers then teamed up to coordinate and resume development, and finally in 2004 the first ever open source YAM (2.3) was released. During the next decade YAM managed to become a much more mature, stable and usable program. Along that time however, the developer team also lost most of its members, but YAM still remains today as one of the most iconic and popular pieces of Amiga software.

Recognition 

At the peak of his popularity, and as a token of appreciation from the Amiga community at large, Marcel Beck received in 1998 the AAA Award International. The award presentation was held at the World of Amiga show in London, UK, and it was hosted by Amiga and Cloanto with the help of several Amiga user groups. Mr. Beck could not attend, but in a phone recording he stated that he felt very honored to receive the award, and thanked all YAM users around the world.

See also 

 Comparison of e-mail clients

References

External links
 YAM on Github
 Discussion forum

Amiga software
AmigaOS 4 software
Free email software
MorphOS software
AROS software